Dave Williams (born 1987) is an American far-right politician from Colorado Springs, Colorado. A Republican, Williams represented Colorado House of Representatives District 15, which encompassed Colorado Springs and Cimarron Hills in El Paso County.

Career 
Williams was first elected to the State House in 2016 after winning 67.84% of the vote.

Previously, Williams served as vice-chairman of the El Paso County Republican Party. He works for his family-owned company as Vice President of Logistics.

Williams was the first Latino elected to House District 15. His mother's maiden name is "Sanchez" and their family has roots going back to Mexico and Southern California.

Williams is considered part of the hardline right-wing faction within the Colorado Republican Party. He doesn't believe in compromising with Democrats and independents. Since Joe Biden defeated Donald Trump in the 2020 presidential election, Williams has questioned the results of the election and has promoted unsubstantiated claims of voter fraud.

On December 7, 2020, Williams and 7 other Republicans requested to the Speaker of the House KC Becker that a committee be formed on "election integrity" to conduct an audit of the Dominion Voting Systems used in Colorado's 2020 elections in spite of no evidence of issues. The request was rejected, with Becker criticizing it as a promotion of "debunked conspiracy theories."

In July 2021, Williams and Ron Hanks held a town hall at Colorado Springs in which both made multiple false claims of election fraud. Williams claimed that 5,600 dead people voted in the 2020 Colorado elections and that fraud played a role in Democrat John Hickenlooper's victory against Republican Cory Gardner.

In December 2021, Williams announced his campaign bid aimed at challenging Rep. Doug Lamborn. He attempted to get listed on the ballot as Dave "Let's Go Brandon" Williams, but this was rejected by Colorado Secretary of State Jena Griswold. In the 2022 Republican primary election for Colorado's 5th congressional district, incumbent representative Doug Lamborn defeated Williams and two other Republican Party challengers.

On March 11, 2023, Williams was elected chair of the Colorado Republican Party for a two-year term.

Colorado Politician Accountability Act 
During the first year of his first term (2017), Williams introduced a bill (HB17-1134) titled the "Colorado Politician Accountability Act". The bill was designed to crack down on sanctuary cities by allowing public officials of sanctuary cities who had not sought to overturn the local sanctuary law to be sued by citizens if an illegal alien committed a crime, and also by making elected officials of sanctuary jurisdictions liable to penalties for "rendering assistance to an illegal alien". The bill was defeated in the House but Williams and two Senate co-sponsors reintroduced it with few changes in 2018 as HB18-1178.

References

External links
 Campaign website
 State House website
 Colorado House Republicans: profile page

21st-century American politicians
Businesspeople from Colorado Springs, Colorado
Candidates in the 2022 United States House of Representatives elections
Far-right politicians in the United States
Hispanic and Latino American state legislators in Colorado
Living people
Republican Party members of the Colorado House of Representatives
Politicians from Colorado Springs, Colorado
Year of birth missing (living people)